Norman Mitchell (birth unknown – death unknown) was a professional rugby league footballer who played in the 1950s. He played at club level for the Featherstone Rovers (Heritage No. 330), as an occasional goal-kicking , i.e. number 2 or 5.

Club career
Mitchell made his début for the Featherstone Rovers on Saturday 8 December 1951, and he played his last match for the Featherstone Rovers during the 1955–56 season, he appears to have scored no drop-goals (or field-goals as they are currently known in Australasia), but prior to the 1974–75 season all goals, whether; conversions, penalties, or drop-goals, scored 2-points, consequently prior to this date drop-goals were often not explicitly documented, therefore '0' drop-goals may indicate drop-goals not recorded, rather than no drop-goals scored.

Challenge Cup Final appearances
Mitchell played , i.e. number 5, in Featherstone Rovers' 12–18 defeat by Workington Town in the 1952 Challenge Cup Final during the 1951–52 season at Wembley Stadium, London on Saturday 19 April 1952, in front of a crowd of 72,093.

References

External links
Search for "Mitchell" at rugbyleagueproject.org
Match Programme: Featherstone ...
Eric Batten

Featherstone Rovers players
Place of birth missing
Place of death missing
English rugby league players
Rugby league wingers
Year of birth missing
Year of death missing